The Central District of Chadegan County is a district (bakhsh) in Chadegan County, Isfahan Province, Iran. At the 2006 census, its population was 26,759, in 6,658 families.  The District has two cities: Chadegan and Rozveh. The District has two rural districts (dehestan): Kabutarsorkh Rural District and Kaveh Ahangar Rural District.

References 

Chadegan County
Districts of Isfahan Province